Roy Keane incident may refer to:
 Alf-Inge Håland incident in the 2001 Manchester derby
 Saipan incident in the build-up to the 2002 World Cup Finals

See also
 Roy Keane